Thomas Price, professionally known as Tom Price, is a Hong Kong-born actor known for his roles in S.M.A.R.T. Chase and Amphetamine.

Career 
Price was the joint lead, with Byron Pang, in the film Amphetamine. He played the character of Daniel.

He appeared as Ciem in S.M.A.R.T. Chase.

Filmography

Films

Television series

References

External links 
 

1985 births
Hong Kong people
University of Sydney alumni
Living people